Monotoma testacea is a species of root-eating beetle in the family Monotomidae. It is found in Australia, Europe and Northern Asia (excluding China), and North America.

References

Further reading

 
 

Monotomidae
Articles created by Qbugbot
Beetles described in 1845